Myaung may refer to several places in Burma:

Myaung -town in Sagaing Region
Myaung Township-township in Sagaing Region
Myaung, Okpho